I Visionari may refer to:
The Visionaries (film)
I Visionari (album)